The 2013 Formula Renault 2.0 Alps Series was the third year of the Formula Renault 2.0 Alps series, and the twelfth season of the former Swiss Formula Renault Championship. The championship began on 6 April at Vallelunga and finished on 6 October at Imola after fourteen races held at seven meetings.

Debutant Antonio Fuoco dominated the championship from the first round, clinching both the junior and overall championship titles with a race to spare. Prema Powerteam drivers Luca Ghiotto and Bruno Bonifacio completed the top three in the drivers' standings, with the trio winning all fourteen races between them; Fuoco won six races, Ghiotto five and Bonifacio three. Ghiotto and Bonifacio also accrued enough points to win the teams title for Prema, with Fuoco's sister Prema Junior outfit finishing second.

Drivers and teams

Race calendar and results
The seven-event calendar for the 2013 season was announced on 25 October 2012.

Championship standings

Drivers' Championship

Juniors' championship

Teams' championship
Prior to each round of the championship, two drivers from each team – if applicable – are nominated to score teams' championship points.

References

External links
 Official website of the Formula Renault 2.0 Alps championship

Alps
Formula Renault 2.0 Alps
Renault Alps